Irina Yurievna Annenkova (born February 22, 1999, in Sochi, Krasnodar Krai, Russia) is a Russian individual rhythmic gymnast. She is the 2014 Youth Olympic champion and the 2014 European Junior ball and ribbon champion.

Personal life
Annenkova has been practicing gymnastics since the age of 5 but it wasn't until she was 7 years old she had her proper training after begging her grandmother to take her to rhythmic gymnastics class, considered a late start for the sport.

Career 
Her international breakthrough event was competing in junior division at the 2012 Moscow Grand Prix. In 2013, Annenkova finished 15th in all-around at the 2013 Russian Junior Championships, she finished 2nd place as out of competition at 2013 Moscow Grand Prix behind Yulia Bravikova. She has also competed at the 2013 Russian-Chinese Youth Games where she won the all-around gold and medaled in all 4 of the event finals. Annenkova briefly competed as member of the Russian Group but returned to competing as an individual gymnast.

In 2014, Annenkova finished 6th in all-around at the 2014 Russian Junior championships. At the 2014 European Junior Championships Annenkova together with teammates (Veronika Polyakova, Yulia Bravikova and Olesya Petrova) won Russia the Team gold. She qualified to 2 event finals winning gold in ball and ribbon. She then competed at the Junior World Cup in Sofia where she won the all-around gold beating Veronika Polyakova by 2.5 points. Following the leg injury of Yulia Bravikova, both Annenkova and Polyakova flew to Nanjing but Annenkova was selected by Irina Viner as the final representative of her country at the 2014 Youth Olympic Games in Nanjing, China. Annenkova led after the qualification round and went on to win in the all-around finals with a total score of 58.575 points putting her ahead of Belarusian Mariya Trubach and America's Laura Zeng.

Senior 
In 2015 season, Annenkova debuted as a senior competing in the international division at the 2015 Moscow Grand Prix. She then competed at the 2015 Baltic Hoop where she won the all-around silver behind Belarusian Melitina Staniouta. In the event finals, Annenkova won 3 gold medals (ball, clubs, ribbon) and silver in hoop. On April 3–5, Annenkova competed at the Irina Deleanu International tournament and won the all-around silver medal behind Veronika Polyakova. Annenkova finished 6th in all-around at the 2015 Russian Championships. Annenkova competed as an HC (Out of Competition) at the MTK International Tournament in Budapest and Dundee Cup International in Sofia.

In 2016, Annenkova began her season competing at the 2016 Grand Prix Moscow finishing 14th in the all-around. In 2017, Annenkova competed at the International Tournament of Portimao and won silver in the all-around.

In 2018, Anenkova competed at the 2018 Moscow International tournament finishing second in the all-around behind Anastasiia Salos.

Routine music information

References

External links 

 
 2014 YOG Profile
 Rhythmic Gymnastics Results

1999 births
Living people
Russian rhythmic gymnasts
Sportspeople from Sochi
Gymnasts at the 2014 Summer Youth Olympics
Youth Olympic gold medalists for Russia
21st-century Russian women